The 2008 elections for the Texas delegation of the United States House of Representatives was held on November 4, 2008. 31 of 32 congressional seats that make up the state's delegation were contested.  In Texas's 14th congressional district no one challenged incumbent Ron Paul.  Since Representatives are elected for two-year terms, those elected will serve in the 111th United States Congress from January 4, 2009, until January 3, 2011.

The 2008 presidential election, 2008 Senate election, and 2008 Texas Legislature election occurred on the same date, as well as many local elections and ballot initiatives.

Overview

District 1

Sophomore Republican Louie Gohmert of Tyler was elected in 2004 following a controversial redistricting in 2003 by then-House Majority Leader Tom DeLay that moved the district of incumbent Democrat Max Sandlin into a strongly Republican constituency. Sandlin was defeated by a 24-point margin in 2004, and Gohmert won in 2006 with 68% of the vote. The district is a purely East Texas one stretching from the Tyler and Longview–Marshall areas in the north to the Lufkin–Nacogdoches area due south.  Gohmert was renominated, while no Democrats ran in the 2008 primary.

District 2 

Republican Ted Poe of Humble was one of four Republicans who defeated a Democratic challenger (Nick Lampson, now representing District 22) in the 2004 elections. Poe won 56% of the vote in 2004 and 66% in 2006, making him one of only a handful of Republicans who gained from the previous election (In 2006, Democrats, who won control of the House from Republicans, generally improved on their 2004 margins). The district stretches from the northern Harris County and Houston suburbs of Spring and Kingwood to southern Liberty County and much of the Golden Triangle region. Poe was renominated, while no Democrats ran in the 2008 primary. The Libertarian Party nominated Craig Wolfe.

District 3 

Longtime Republican Sam Johnson of Plano was 78 in 2008 but chose not to retire.  He won the Republican nomination. Tom Daley was the Democratic nominee and Christopher J. Claytor was the Libertarian nominee.

This district includes several northern and northeastern suburbs of Dallas, including southwestern Collin County (including Plano and McKinney) and northeastern Dallas County including large portions of Garland and Richardson, as well as some northern portions of Dallas itself. The district is heavily Caucasian, upper-middle class, and Republican, with incomes averaging around the $75,000 range.

District 4 

Republican Ralph Hall of Rockwall, the oldest living member of the House of Representatives at the time, faced Democratic nominee Glenn Melancon. CQ Politics considered the race 'Safe Republican'.

Hall has represented the district since 1980, first elected as an "old-time" conservative Democrat before becoming a Republican in 2004. He won the 2008 primary election, defeating foreign relations expert Joshua Kowert; businessman and NASCAR team owner Gene Christensen; and former Frisco mayor Kathy Seei.

This Northeast Texas district encompasses the Ark-La-Tex, the Rockwall County suburbs of Dallas, and the Sherman–Denison area.

District 5 

Jeb Hensarling, a Republican from Dallas, was first elected in 2002 to a heavily Republican district comprising east Dallas and its neighboring suburbs, and stretching to the south and east to a number of small East Texas counties. A favorite among fiscal conservatives in Texas, Hensarling is a potential challenger for the U.S. Senate in 2012 should the incumbent Republican, Kay Bailey Hutchison, retire. In 2008, Hensarling is expected to win another term in this district despite recent Democratic gains in Dallas County.  Hensarling was renominated, while no Democrats ran in the 2008 primary.

District 6 

Twelve-term Republican Joe Barton of Ennis was the chair of the House Energy and Commerce Committee until Democrats took over the House in 2006.  The district stretches from Arlington southward to several east central Texas counties all the way to Trinity County, which is west of Lufkin and is heavily Republican.  Barton won the 2008 primary, and faced Democratic winner Ludwig Otto in the general election.

District 7 

Incumbent Republican John Culberson faced Democratic businessman Michael Skelly in this Houston area district. CQ Politics considered this race 'Leans Republican'.

Culberson won a surprisingly modest 59% of the vote in 2006 in what is otherwise a normally strong Republican district. He was still favored to win in 2008, given the 2006 anti-Republican trend and the normally Republican voting trend of this mainly suburban district, which is among the most affluent in the nation.  Skelly, a former executive of Horizon Wind Energy, earned an MBA from Harvard after serving in the Peace Corps. He currently serves on Houston Mayor Bill White's Green Building Advisory Committee.

The district, which was once represented by former President George H. W. Bush, includes much of heavily Republican west Houston—such as River Oaks, Uptown and Upper Kirby, Memorial/Spring Branch area, and the island cities of Bellaire, West University Place, and Jersey Village, as well as many unincorporated areas of northwest Harris County including a large chunk of the Cypress-Fairbanks area. The district also includes the heavily Democratic Neartown area. No Democrat has served this district since 1966, before the district was based in its current location.

District 8 

Republican Kevin Brady of The Woodlands represents a strongly GOP district centered on the northern suburbs and exurbs of Houston and Beaumont as well as the Huntsville and Lake Livingston areas, winning two thirds of the vote in 2004 and 2006. The district was expected to remain in Republican hands; no Democrat has won this district 1978. Brady won the 2008 primary and faced Democrat Kent Hargett.

District 9 

Sophomore Democrat Al Green was not expected to face a serious challenge in 2008 for his heavily Democratic district, which is situated in southwest Houston and includes Houston's Southside, as well as the Mission Bend and Alief areas (which have large Asian-American populations) and several heavily black and Hispanic northeastern neighborhoods of Missouri City. He was elected by a 3 to 1 margin in 2004 after defeating displaced incumbent Congressman and fellow Democrat Chris Bell in the primary (Bell was moved out of his previous district in the controversial 2003 redistricting engineered by then-House Majority Leader Tom DeLay), and won a second term unopposed in 2006. Green was renominated, while no Republicans ran in the 2008 primary.

District 10 

Incumbent Republican nominee Michael McCaul of Austin was challenged by Democratic nominee Larry Joe Doherty, a legal ethics attorney and former TV courtroom judge. CQ Politics considered this race 'Republican Favored'.  In 2006, McCaul won only 55% of the vote against Democratic challenger, Ted Ankrum, and Libertarian Michael Badnarik.

This Republican-leaning district stretches from north Austin into Brenham traveling all the way to several far western and northwestern suburbs of Houston.

District 11 

Midland Republican Mike Conaway represents George W. Bush's strongest district in the 2004 election. He won 77% of the vote in 2004 and was one of only a handful of Republicans who ran unopposed in 2006. Conaway's district stretches from the Midland and San Angelo areas to several mostly rural areas northwest of Austin. No Democrat ran in the 2008 primary.

District 12 

Republican Kay Granger, who is considered a moderate by Texas Republican standards, won two thirds of the vote in 2006, outperforming most of her fellow Texas Republican colleagues. The popular Fort Worth-based Granger was expected to win re-election in 2008 in this district comprising western areas of Fort Worth and surrounding areas.

District 13 

Mac Thornberry represents this Texas Panhandle district that encompasses Amarillo and Wichita Falls. The Clarendon Republican won by a 3 to 1 margin in 2006 and faced only a Libertarian candidate in 2004.

District 14 

Republican Ron Paul is best known for his strong libertarian views. His slogan, "The Taxpayers' Best Friend", emphasizes his strong — and sometimes controversial — takes on fiscal conservatism, while his social policies, which includes ending the federal War on Drugs and legalizing marijuana, as well as his belief that the federal government should not be involved in wedge issues such as gay marriage, leading to a more negative nickname, "Dr. No", for his votes against much of the legislative agenda of both parties in Congress.

The 73-year-old physician is a resident of Surfside. Paul was a Republican candidate in the 2008 presidential election (his second, following his run as Libertarian Party nominee in 1988), and ran un-opposed for re-election.

In 2006, Ron Paul won 60% of the vote against Democratic opponent Shane Sklar, a young rancher and Executive Director of the Independent Cattlemen's Association of Texas (ICA) who ran on a promise to serve as a fiscally conservative Blue Dog Democrat and received a slightly more favorable rating from the NRA, in attempt to defeat the popular Paul. In 2008, Paul was renominated, while no Democrats ran in the primary. The district extends from several far southern and southeastern areas of Houston, including Galveston and Brazoria County, to the Bay City, Wharton County, and Victoria areas.

District 15 

Democrat Rubén Hinojosa of Mercedes won 62% of the vote in 2004 in a South Texas district that had to be realigned following a Supreme Court decision that made the neighboring 23rd District unconstitutional. Hinojosa, who was 68 in 2008, won the Democrat nomination.

District 16 

Democrat Silvestre Reyes represents El Paso and is the Chairman of the Permanent Select Committee on Intelligence, which could make him a target of some conservative Republicans over issues relating to immigration in spite of the fact that Reyes was a former border patrol agent. Still, the district remains overwhelmingly Democratic due to its large Hispanic population, and Reyes is popular with his constituents. He won two thirds of the 2004 vote in a district that swung strongly in favor of John Kerry, and won with no Republican challenger in 2006.  Reyes was renominated, while no Republican ran in the 2008 primary.

District 17 

Democrat Chet Edwards has been targeted for defeat in many recent elections. His district is widely seen as arguably the most heavily Republican district held by a Democrat, and won a close election in 2004, but recovered in 2006 with a strong eighteen point win.  The district, which includes the official residence of George W. Bush, stretches from several rural areas south of Fort Worth to Edwards' hometown of Waco and the Brazos Valley region, which comprises the Bryan–College Station area.  This district gave George W. Bush 70% of the vote in 2004. Edwards won the 2008 Democratic nomination.

District 18 

Democrat Sheila Jackson Lee represents one of the most heavily Democratic areas in the state, covering several largely poor and African-American areas of Houston (including downtown Houston) and whose three previous representatives (Barbara Jordan, Mickey Leland, and Craig Washington) were all African-Americans and took staunch liberal stances.

A regular during C-SPAN's gavel-to-gavel coverage of the House while it is in session, Jackson Lee has also been seen as controversial, and is considered by some to be one of the "meanest" members of the House, as she is known to have one of the highest turnover rates of any congressional staff. Still, she is a well-respected figure in the district, and has been re-elected with at least 80% of the vote many times. Jackson Lee won the Democratic nomination.

District 19 

Republican Randy Neugebauer of Lubbock won re-election in 2006 with 68% of the vote. His district is heavily Republican and stretches from Lubbock to Big Spring and Abilene and was created in the controversial 2003 Texas redistricting, which in 2004 led to the defeat of Neugebauer's challenger, conservative Democrat Charles Stenholm.

District 20 

Democrat Charlie Gonzalez represents much of heavily Democratic, largely Hispanic inner San Antonio, including the downtown area. Gonzalez won 87% of the vote in 2006 against a Libertarian opponent and two thirds of the 2004 vote. Gonzalez was heavily favored to win re-election to this seat, which was once held by his father, Henry Gonzalez for nearly four decades. The Gonzalez family had represented this district for 47 years as of 2008.

District 21 

Longtime representative Lamar S. Smith was the only Republican to win among the five congressional districts realigned as a result of a Supreme Court ruling that declared the nearby 23rd District unconstitutional as a result of allegations of diluted Hispanic voting power during the controversial 2003 Texas redistricting. Smith ended up being moved into a district that now encompasses several northern San Antonio suburbs as well as the Texas Hill Country and western parts of Travis County.  The district includes a heavily Democratic portion of Austin, including the area around the University of Texas at Austin.  However, it is no match for the heavily Republican areas around San Antonio.  The Supreme Court decision restored a large amount of territory that had been shifted to Henry Bonilla's district in 2003.  Smith won 60% of the vote in 2006 against six challengers, including two Democrats, in a special election that resulted from the ruling.  Smith was renominated, while no Democrats ran in the 2008 primary.

District 22 

The 2008 election for Texas's 22nd congressional district was held on November 4, 2008, as part of the United States House of Representatives elections for the 111th United States Congress. Pete Olson defeated the incumbent Nick Lampson.

This race was considered a key race because the seat was previously held by former House Majority Leader Tom DeLay, as well as the fact that the seat was represented by a Democrat, Nick Lampson, whose victory was largely attributed to Republicans being forced to run a write-in campaign.  The Republican candidate was Pete Olson who faced the incumbent, Lampson.

Olson clearly led the race in the weeks leading up to election day. On October 22, 2008, poll by John Zogby and the Houston Chronicle stated that Olson had a 17-point lead over Lampson. On October 30, 2008, Larry Sabato predicted in his Crystal Ball newsletter that Olson's congressional race to be a "Republican Pick Up."

Results by county

District 23 

Ciro Rodriguez, a former Democratic congressman from San Antonio, faced Republican nominee Bexar County Commissioner Lyle Larson and Libertarian Lani Connolly in this majority-Hispanic district. CQ Politics considered this race 'Leans Democratic'.

Rodriguez defeated incumbent Republican Henry Bonilla in a December runoff after finishing in second place to Bonilla during the November general election, when Rodriguez himself ran out of money but was later helped by the DCCC. He was a former congressman who represented the nearby 28th District until a controversial redistricting plan that made this district more heavily Republican and favorable to Bonilla resulted in his defeat by that district's current representative, Henry Cuellar. Bonilla was seen as an ally of Tom DeLay, who engineered the redistricting. Also, a Supreme Court ruled Bonilla's district, which was situated in the Hill Country suburbs of San Antonio, unconstitutional over claims that Hispanic voting rights were diluted in the redistricting. This resulted in the 23rd becoming much more Democratic with the addition of south San Antonio, which is Rodriguez's home base, and the removal of the Hill Country portions from the district, which were moved to Lamar S. Smith's district.

Larson is a public official and businessman in San Antonio. A graduate of Texas A&M University, he worked as a salesman for Ethicon, a subsidiary of Johnson & Johnson. In 1991 and 1993, Larson was elected to the San Antonio City Council. In 1996, he was elected as one of the four Bexar County commissioners. He defeated attorney and banker Quico Canseco in the Republican primary for the U.S. House in 2008.

In addition to southern San Antonio and Bexar County, the district also includes several northwestern areas of San Antonio. Other areas represented in the district include the border towns of Del Rio and Eagle Pass, as well as Big Bend National Park and eastern El Paso County. It includes more than 600 miles of the Texas–Mexico border.

District 24 

Republican Kenny Marchant of Coppell won 60% of the vote in this Republican-leaning district that gave George W. Bush 65% of the vote in 2004. Marchant is heavily favored to win re-election to this district, which is located in the middle of the Dallas/Fort Worth Metroplex and includes the suburbs of Duncanville and Cedar Hill in the south, Grand Prairie and part of Irving in the central area of the district, and Colleyville, Grapevine and the Carrollton–Farmers Branch area in the north, as well as Dallas/Fort Worth International Airport. Marchant's district was previously represented by Martin Frost, who was moved out of this district in Tom DeLay's controversial 2003 redistricting of the state.

District 25 

Austin Democrat Lloyd Doggett represents a Democratic-leaning constituency that is centered on the Austin area and several smaller rural areas to the south and east which either lean Republican or strongly favor Republicans. Doggett won 67% of the vote against a largely unknown Republican opponent who initially ran as a Libertarian until the previous 25th district was thrown out in a Supreme Court ruling that declared the nearby 23rd District of Henry Bonilla unconstitutional; this district was realigned as a result of the controversial mid-decade redistricting engineered by former House Majority Leader Tom DeLay, which realigned Doggett's district into a linear form that was derisively referred to as the "fajita strip".

District 26 

Republican Michael Burgess of Lewisville won 60% of the vote in 2006 against an underfunded Democratic opponent, a six-percent drop from his 2004 victory against another Democrat. However, Burgess remains assured of a safe seat, as his seat takes in most of Denton County as well as parts of Fort Worth and lean heavily in favor of the Republican Party. The district was once represented by former House Majority Leader Dick Armey, who engineered the 1994 Republican Revolution along with former House Speaker Newt Gingrich.

District 27 

The District is represented by Moderate Democrat Solomon Ortiz, the Dean of the Congressional Hispanic Caucus. Ortiz received 57% of the vote in 2006, a six-point decline from his 2004 performance, which was somewhat of an anomaly given the strong anti-Republican voting mood of 2006, where Democrats either performed above their 2004 performance or ran without opposition. In 2004, George W. Bush carried this South Texas district, which includes Corpus Christi as well as Brownsville and South Padre Island.

District 28 

Conservative Democrat Henry Cuellar won 68% of the vote in 2006 against another Democrat who received 20% of the vote. Even though Cuellar is becoming a rising star in the Democratic Party, and has even been seen by some as a potential Democratic challenger to Senator John Cornyn, Cuellar could face a challenge for his seat, which includes Laredo (where Cuellar resides) and areas south of San Antonio, due to his somewhat conservative voting record. For instance, Cuellar received the backing of the conservative Club for Growth during his 2006 primary campaign against Ciro Rodriguez, his predecessor, who later went on to win the 23rd District held by Republican Henry Bonilla, whom Cuellar nearly defeated in 2002. Cuellar won the Democratic nomination.

District 29 

Democrat Gene Green of Houston has won re-election easily without facing a primary challenge in this strongly Latino, heavily Democratic district, which covers eastern portions of Houston as well as some of its suburbs.

District 30 

Incumbent Democratic nominee Eddie Bernice Johnson of Dallas defeated Republican nominee Fred Wood 82.6–15.8%. This district includes the inner city areas of Dallas, including its downtown areas, as well as several southern Dallas County suburbs south of the city which boast a large African-American population.

District 31 

John Carter of Round Rock won 59% of the vote in 2006 against a token Democratic opponent. His district, which was created as a result of the 2000 Census, stretches across a large segment of Central Texas from the northern Williamson County suburbs of Austin to the gigantic Fort Hood military base, all the way north to Stephenville. This description of the district would make it an opportunity for the Fighting Dems, a faction of military veterans who are members of the Democratic Party. Radio producer Brian P. Ruiz of Hutto won the Democratic nomination.

District 32 

Six-term incumbent and conservative Republican Pete Sessions faced Democrat Eric Roberson in this Dallas district. CQ Politics considered the race 'Safe Republican'.

Sessions was considered to be a vulnerable candidate for a number of reasons. First, he is known to have close ties to disgraced lobbyist Jack Abramoff, an issue that is likely to become the focus of his Democratic challenger's campaign in 2008. Also, while Sessions improved on his margin from his hotly contested 2004 race against Democrat Martin Frost, who was displaced from his previous district as a result of the controversial 2003 redistricting engineered by former House Majority Leader and Abramoff ally, Tom DeLay, it was only by a 2% margin (from 54% in 2004 to 56% in 2006). Contrarily, George W. Bush carried 59% of the vote in the district to 41% of the vote for John Kerry in 2004. Finally, in 2006, Democrats made unexpected gains in Dallas County, winning the District Attorney office and all contested state district judgeships in the county, along with a number of countywide offices on the basis of corruption within the local Republican establishment as well as momentum gained from Democratic Dallas County Sheriff Lupe Valdez's unexpected 2004 victory.

Roberson won against Steve Love in the April 8 party runoff election to determine the Democratic nominee.

This Republican-leaning district includes several northern affluent areas of Dallas, including Highland Park, and significant chunks of the suburbs of Irving and Richardson.

References

External links 
 Elections Division from the Texas Secretary of State
 U.S. Congress candidates for Texas at Project Vote Smart
 Texas U.S. House Races from 2008 Race Tracker
 Campaign contributions for Texas congressional races from OpenSecrets
 Election Results from The New York Times

2008
Texas
United States House of Representatives